Christina Hull Paxson (born February 6, 1960) is an American economist and public health expert serving as the 19th president of Brown University. Previously, she was the Hughes Rogers Professor of Economics & Public Affairs at Princeton University as well as the dean of Princeton School of Public and International Affairs.

In March 2012, Paxson was selected as the 19th president of Brown University. She officially succeeded Ruth Simmons on July 1, 2012, and was inaugurated on October 27, 2012.

Early life and education
After spending her childhood in Forest Hills, a suburb of Pittsburgh, Pennsylvania, Paxson received her B.A. from Swarthmore College in 1982, where she majored in economics and minored in English and philosophy as a member of the Phi Beta Kappa Society.

Originally a graduate student at Columbia University's Business School, Paxson transferred to Columbia's Graduate School of Arts and Sciences, receiving her M.A. and Ph.D. in economics, in 1985 and 1987, respectively, with a focus on labor. Paxson was advised by Joseph Altonji and her dissertation involved analyzing the effects of consumer interest rates on the consumer credit market. Paxson is married to Ari Gabinet and has two children, Nicholas and Benjamin. Raised a Quaker, she converted to her husband's Jewish faith.

Career 
In 2000, she founded the Center for Health and Wellbeing at Princeton, an interdisciplinary research center based in the Woodrow Wilson School. She served as the chair of Princeton's Economics Department in academic year 2008–09. She was also the founding director of an NIA Center for the Economics and Demography of Aging at Princeton. During her time at Princeton, Paxson also served as a visiting professor at the University of Pennsylvania's Wharton School.

Paxson's most recent research focuses on the impact of childhood health and circumstances on economic and health outcomes over the lifecourse; the impact of the AIDS crisis on children's health and education in Africa; and the long run consequences of Hurricane Katrina on the mental and physical health of vulnerable populations. Paxson has been a Senior Editor of The Future of Children, an interdisciplinary journal that works to build a bridge between cutting edge social science research and the policy community.

Brown University

As President of Brown University, Paxson has focused on a set of strategic goals announced in 2014; among these institutional priorities are data science, the creative arts, and brain science. Under Paxson's leadership, the University has established a School of Public Health as well as numerous centers and institutes including the Brown Arts Institute, the Brown Institute for Translational Science, the Data Science Initiative, and the Nelson Center for Entrepreneurship.

For three consecutive years under her leadership, Brown students and graduates have earned the most Fulbright Scholarships of all U.S. Universities.

She has also sustained undergraduate financial aid as the fastest growing area of Brown's budget by increasing scholarships for low-income families and eliminating loans from University-awarded financial aid packages, as part of The Brown Promise, in addition to Brown's Pathways to Diversity and Inclusion action plan.

Paxson has overseen a considerable expansion of Brown's academic, performing arts, and residential facilities. Expansion of Brown's physical footprint under Paxson's leadership has been controversial, at times spurring criticism from community organizations and preservation groups.

In 2019, she told the University that she would not honor a student-sponsored referendum calling for Brown to divest from companies that engage in human rights abuses in Palestine, and said that it would not be possible to make the details of the University's investments available to the public. She has been a member of the Kol Emet congregation, a Jewish Reconstructionist synagogue, committed to the growth of a spiritually and intellectually engaging Judaism.

A Fall 2021 poll conducted by The Brown Daily Herald found that 47.1% of surveyed students "strongly" or "somewhat" disapproved of Paxson's leadership while 32.8% "strongly" or "somewhat" approved. The publication's Fall 2017 poll placed Paxson's approval rating at 61.9%.

Other Activities 
In 2013, Paxson wrote a New Republic op-ed, arguing for ongoing relevance of the humanities from an economist's perspective.

Paxson has also maintained numerous institutional affiliations: in addition to being a member of the Council on Foreign Relations, she was elected to the American Academy of Arts and Sciences in 2017. The previous year, she became a member of the board of directors of the Federal Reserve Bank of Boston. After serving as its deputy chair, she became the chair of its board of directors in 2021. In 2018, Paxson received an honorary doctorate from Williams College.

In wake of the COVID-19 pandemic, Paxson penned a New York Times op-ed and appeared on CNN, outlining her views on the importance of reopening colleges safely in the fall of 2020. On June 4, 2020, Paxson testified before the U.S. Senate Committee on Health, Education, Labor and Pensions, during a hearing entitled “COVID-19: Going Back to College Safely."

Selected publications
 “Stature and Status: Height, Ability, and Labor Market Outcomes” (with Anne Case), Journal of Political Economy, 116(3): 499–532, June 2008.
 “Racial Disparities in Childhood Asthma in the US: Evidence from the National Health Interview Survey, 1997–2003” (with Marla McDaniel and Jane Waldfogel), Pediatrics 117(5): e868-e877, May 2006.
 “Orphans in Africa: Parental Death, Poverty and School Enrollment” (with Anne Case and Joseph Ableidinger), Demography 41(3), pp. 483–508, August 2004.
 “Economic Status and Health in Childhood: The Origins of the Gradient” (with Anne Case and Darren Lubotsky), American Economic Review 92(5), December 2002.
 “Economies of Scale, Household Size, and the Demand for Food” (with Angus Deaton), Journal of Political Economy 106(5): 897–930, October 1998.
 “Intertemporal Choice and Inequality” (with Angus Deaton), Journal of Political Economy 102(3): 437–467, 1994.
 “Consumption and Income Seasonality in Thailand,” Journal of Political Economy 101(1): 39–72, February 1993.
 “Using Weather Variability to Estimate the Response of Savings to Transitory Income in Thailand,” American Economic Review 82(1), March 1992.
"Causes and Consequences of Early Life Health" (with Anne Case) Demography 47(1): S65-S85, March 2010.
"The Long Reach of Childhood Health and Circumstance: Evidence from the Whitehall II Study" (with Anne Case), Economic Journal, Royal Economic Society 121(554): F183-F204, 2008. 
"The Impact of the AIDS Pandemic on Health Services in Africa: Evidence from Demographic and Health Surveys" (With Anne Case), Demography 48(2): 675–697, May 2009.
"Making Sense of the Labor Market Height Premium: Evidence From the British Household Panel Survey" (With Anne Case and Mahnaz Islam), Economics Letters 102(3): 174–176, March 2008.
"The Income Gradient in Children's Health: A Comment on Currie, Shields and Wheatley Price" (With Anne Case & Diana Lee), Journal of Health Economics 27(3), 801–807, October 2007
"Socioeconomic Status and Health in Childhood: A Comment on Chen, Martin and Matthews" (With Anne Case & Tom Vogl), Social Science & Medicine, 189-214
"From Cradle to Grave? The Lasting Impact of Childhood Health and Circumstance" (With Anne Case & Angela Fertig), Journal of Health Economics 24(2), 365-389.

References

External links
Brown University Office of the President
Christina Paxson Biography from Brown University
Paxson Curriculum Vitae
Publications on the National Bureau of Economic Research

1960 births
Columbia Graduate School of Arts and Sciences alumni
Labor economists
Living people
Presidents of Brown University
Swarthmore College alumni
Princeton University faculty
Women heads of universities and colleges
Converts to Judaism from Christianity
American Jews
Jewish American academics
Opposition to Boycott, Divestment and Sanctions